Walker Blaine (May 8, 1855 – January 15, 1890) was an official in the United States Department of State.

Biography

Walker Blaine was born in Augusta, Maine, on May 8, 1855, the son of James G. Blaine and Harriet (Stanwood) Blaine.  In 1876, he graduated from Yale College, where he served on the third editorial board of The Yale Record and was a member of Skull and Bones.  He then earned his law degree from Columbia Law School.

After law school, Blaine joined the law office of Senator Cushman Kellogg Davis (R–Minn.) in Saint Paul, Minnesota.  In 1881, Blaine's father became the United States Secretary of State in the administration of President of the United States James A. Garfield.  Blaine's father named him Third Assistant Secretary of State, with Blaine holding this office from July 1, 1881, until June 30, 1882.  During his time as Third Assistant Secretary, Blaine and William Henry Trescot were sent on a special diplomatic mission to South America.  Following the death of Garfield and the resignation of the older Blaine, President Chester A. Arthur appointed Walker Blaine assistant counsel of the United States for the Court of Commissioners of Alabama Claims.  Blaine held this office until the court's abolition on January 1, 1886.  He then moved to Chicago to practice law.  In 1889, Blaine's father became Secretary of State for the second time (this time in the Benjamin Harrison administration) and James G. Blaine again secured a position for Walker Blaine in the United States Department of State, this time as Solicitor of the Department of State.

Walker Blaine died in Washington, D.C., unexpectedly on January 15, 1890, of pneumonia that followed a bout of influenza.  He is buried at Oak Hill Cemetery in Washington.

References

External links
"Walker Blaine Dead", New York Times, Jan. 15, 1890

The Late Walker Blaine, Harper's Weekly, January 25, 1890

1855 births
1890 deaths
United States Assistant Secretaries of State
People from Augusta, Maine
Yale College alumni
Columbia Law School alumni
Deaths from pneumonia in Washington, D.C.
Infectious disease deaths in Washington, D.C.
Deaths from the 1889–1890 flu pandemic
Burials at Oak Hill Cemetery (Washington, D.C.)
Illinois lawyers
Minnesota lawyers
Maine Republicans
Washington, D.C., Republicans
American people of Scotch-Irish descent
Blaine family
19th-century American lawyers